The Sinking of the Bismarck: The Deadly Hunt is a 1962 historical nonfiction book by William L. Shirer. It tells the story of the Royal Navy's hunt to destroy the German battleship Bismarck, culminating in the final battle where the ship is sunk by gunfire and torpedoes.

References

1962 non-fiction books
German battleship Bismarck
Books about World War II
American history books